The North Atlantic Treaty is the treaty that forms the legal basis of, and is implemented by, the North Atlantic Treaty Organization (NATO). The treaty was signed in Washington, D.C., on 4 April 1949.

Background
The treaty was signed in Washington, D.C., on 4 April 1949 by a committee which was chaired by US diplomat Theodore Achilles. Earlier secret talks had been held at the Pentagon between 22 March and 1 April 1948, of which Achilles said:

The talks lasted about two weeks and by the time they finished, it had been secretly agreed that there would be a treaty, and I had a draft of one in the bottom drawer of my safe. It was never shown to anyone except Jack [Hickerson]. I wish I had kept it, but when I left the Department in 1950, I dutifully left it in the safe and I have never been able to trace it in the archives. It drew heavily on the Rio Treaty, and a bit of the Brussels Treaty, which had not yet been signed, but of which we were being kept heavily supplied with drafts. The eventual North Atlantic Treaty had the general form, and a good bit of the language of my first draft, but with a number of important differences.

According to Achilles, another important author of the treaty was John D. Hickerson:

More than any human being Jack was responsible for the nature, content, and form of the Treaty...It was a one-man Hickerson treaty.

As a fundamental component of NATO, the North Atlantic Treaty is a product of the US' desire to avoid overextension at the end of World War II, and consequently pursue multilateralism in Europe. It is part of the US' collective defense arrangement with Western European powers, following a long and deliberative process. The treaty was created with an armed attack by the Soviet Union against Western Europe in mind, although the mutual self-defense clause was never invoked during the Cold War. 

By signing the North Atlantic Treaty, parties are "determined to safeguard the freedom, common heritage and civilization of the peoples, founded on the principles of democracy, individual liberty and the rule of law."

Members

Founding members

The following twelve states signed the treaty and thus became the founding members of NATO. The following leaders signed the agreement as plenipotentiaries of their countries in Washington, D.C., on 4 April 1949:

  – Prime Minister and Foreign Minister Paul-Henri Spaak and Ambassador Baron 
  – Secretary of State for External Affairs Lester B. Pearson and Ambassador H. H. Wrong
  – Foreign Minister Gustav Rasmussen and Ambassador Henrik Kauffmann
  – Foreign Minister Robert Schuman and Ambassador Henri Bonnet
  – Foreign Minister Bjarni Benediktsson and Ambassador Thor Thors
  – Foreign Minister Carlo Sforza and Ambassador Alberto Tarchiani
  –  Foreign Minister Joseph Bech and Ambassador 
  – Foreign Minister Dirk Stikker and Ambassador Eelco van Kleffens
  – Foreign Minister Halvard M. Lange and Ambassador Wilhelm von Munthe af Morgenstierne
  – Foreign Minister José Caeiro da Mata and Ambassador Pedro Teotónio Pereira
  – Foreign Secretary Ernest Bevin and Ambassador Oliver Franks
  – Secretary of State Dean Acheson

Non-founding members who joined before the dissolution of the Soviet Union
The following four states joined the treaty after the 12 founding states, but before the dissolution of the Soviet Union:

Members who joined after the dissolution of the Soviet Union
The following 14 states joined the treaty after the dissolution of the Soviet Union:

Withdrawal
No state has rescinded its membership but some dependencies of member states have not requested membership after becoming independent:

Articles

Article 1 
Article 1 of the treaty states that member parties "settle any international disputes in which they may be involved by peaceful means in such a manner that international peace and security, and justice, are not endangered, and to refrain in their international relations from the threat or use of force in any manner inconsistent with the purposes of the United Nations."

Members seek to promote stability and well-being in the North Atlantic area through preservation of peace and security in accordance with the Charter of the United Nations.

Article 2 
Article 2 of the treaty stipulates that "The Parties will contribute toward the further development of peaceful and friendly international relations by strengthening their free institutions, by bringing about a better understanding of the principles upon which these institutions are founded, and by promoting conditions of stability and well-being. They will seek to eliminate conflict in their international economic policies and will encourage economic collaboration between any or all of them."  This is sometimes referred to as the "Canadian Clause" after Pearson pushed for its inclusion in the treaty.  This included proposals for a trade council, cultural program, technological sharing, and an information program.  Of those, only the latter two were passed.  Nonetheless, it has been brought up by observers commenting on trade disputes between members.

Article 3 
Article 3 of the treaty states that "In order more effectively to achieve the objectives of this Treaty, the Parties, separately and jointly, by means of continuous and effective self-help and mutual aid, will maintain and develop their individual and collective capacity to resist armed attack."

Recently, this has been interpreted as the basis for the target for a 2% GDP expenditure rule, which was established as a loose guideline in 2006.  This metric was confirmed again during the 2014 Wales summit.

It has also been used as a core concept for a mandate to strengthen member resilience:  the ability to resist and recover from major disasters, failures in infrastructure, or traditional armed attack.  This commitment was first accepted during the 2016 Warsaw summit, and further reiterated and clarified due to the COVID-19 pandemic in 2021.  Per NATO documents, this has been understood to include seven key areas:

 Continuity of government during a crisis
 Energy and power grid infrastructure resilience
 Immigration control
 Food and water security
 Medical emergencies
 Resilient civil communications
 Effective transportation networks

Article 4
Article 4 is generally considered the starting point for major NATO operations, and therefore is intended for either emergencies or situations of urgency. It officially calls for consultation over military matters when "the territorial integrity, political independence or security of any of the parties is threatened."  Upon its invocation, the issue is discussed in the North Atlantic Council, and can formally lead into a joint decision or action (logistic, military, or otherwise) on behalf of the Alliance. It has been officially invoked seven times since the alliance's creation.

There have also been instances where Article 4 was not formally invoked, but instead threatened.  In fact, this was viewed as one of the original intentions for Article 4: as a means to elevate issues and provide member nations a means of deterrence.  For example, in November 2021, the Polish foreign ministry—along with Estonia, Lithuania, and Latvia—briefly considered triggering Article 4 due to the Belarusian migrant crisis, but it was not formally requested.

On 15 November 2022, a missile struck the territory of Poland at the village of Przewodów near the border with Ukraine. The incident occurred during an attack on Ukrainian cities and energy facilities by Russia. It was the first incident of a missile hitting NATO territory during the 2022 Russian invasion of Ukraine.  The NATO Secretary General talked with the Polish President and there was no call for an Article 4 convention, although the government had been in talks to consider invoking it.

Article 5
The key section of the treaty is Article 5. Its commitment clause defines the casus foederis. It commits each member state to consider an armed attack against one member state, in the areas defined by Article 6, to be an armed attack against them all.  Upon such attack, each member state is to assist by taking "such action as [the member state] deems necessary, including the use of armed force, to restore and maintain the security of the North Atlantic area."  The article has only been invoked once, but considered in a number of other cases.

September 11 attacks

It has been invoked only once in NATO history, after the September 11 attacks on the United States in 2001. The invocation was confirmed on 4 October 2001, when NATO determined that the attacks were indeed eligible under the terms of the North Atlantic Treaty. The eight official actions taken by NATO in response to the 9/11 attacks included Operation Eagle Assist and Operation Active Endeavour, a naval operation in the Mediterranean which was designed to prevent the movement of terrorists or weapons of mass destruction, as well as enhancing the security of shipping in general. Active Endeavour began on 4 October 2001.

Threatened invocations

Article 6
Article 6 states that Article 5 covers only member states' territories in Europe, North America, Turkey, and islands in the Atlantic north of the Tropic of Cancer.

It was the opinion in August 1965 of the US State Department, the US Defense Department, and the legal division of NATO that an attack on the U.S. state of Hawaii would not trigger the treaty, but an attack on the other 49 would.
The Spanish cities of Ceuta and Melilla on the North African shore are thus not under NATO protection in spite of Moroccan claims to them.
Legal experts have interpreted that other articles could cover the Spanish North African cities but this take has not been tested in practice. This is also why events such as the Balyun airstrikes did not trigger Article 5, as the Turkish troops that were attacked were in Syria, not Turkey.

On 16 April 2003, NATO agreed to take command of the International Security Assistance Force (ISAF) in Afghanistan, which includes troops from 42 countries. The decision came at the request of Germany and the Netherlands, the two states leading ISAF at the time of the agreement, and all nineteen NATO ambassadors approved it unanimously. The handover of control to NATO took place on 11 August, and marked the first time in NATO's history that it took charge of a mission outside of the area delineated by Article 6.

Articles 7 and 8
In the case of any contradiction with other international obligations (with the exception of the United Nations, which by Article 7 supersedes NATO), or in military conflict of two NATO members, Article 8 comes into force.  This is most important in cases should one member engage in military action against another member, upon which the offending members would be held in abeyance of the treaty and thereby NATO protection as a whole.  This has not occurred yet, but there have been several militarised disputes between NATO allies that have threatened this:

If an intra-NATO conflict were to occur, there exist intra-NATO alliances which would be triggered instead in the instance of the abeyance.  The following is a list of such active, intra-NATO military alliances.

Article 9

Establishes the North Atlantic Council, and is the only NATO body that derives its authority directly from the treaty. Its primary objectives as stated in the treaty is the enforcement of Article 3 and Article 5.

Article 10

Article 10 dictates the process by which other countries may join NATO, which is by unanimous agreement by current NATO members. Further, new NATO members can only consist of other European nations. In practice, this has turned into a set of action plans which an aspiring nation must follow in order to become a member, including the Membership Action Plan (MAP) mechanism and Intensified Dialogue formula.

Article 11
Article 11 indicated the process of the initial ratification of the treaty. Each signatory nation was required to ratify the treaty through their respective constitutional processes. In order to come into force, the treaty had to be ratified by Belgium, Canada, France, Luxembourg, the Netherlands, the United Kingdom, and the United States.

Article 12
Article 12 states the process by which the treaty may be amended, provided such amendments still affect the North Atlantic area and do not violate the Charter of the United Nations.  In practice, this has only been used to clearly delineate which territories are under the purview of NATO.

Article 13

Article 13 delimits the process by which a member leaves NATO, which simply consists of a one-year notice by the member nation to the U.S. government, who then promulgates the notice to the other member nations.  This has been contemplated by many member nations, but so far has not happened aside from withdrawals due to independence of former territories or dependencies (namely, Algeria, Malta, and Cyprus).

Otherwise, the next closest option for a member nation is to instead withdraw from NATO's military command structure, but not from NATO entirely.  This happened with France in 1966, who rejoined in 2009; and happened with Greece in 1974, who still remains absent.

Article 14
Article 14 notes the official languages of NATO as English and French, and that the United States government shall promulgate copies of the treaty to the other member nations.

Changes since signing 
Three official footnotes have been released to reflect the changes made since the treaty was written:

Regarding Article 6:

 The definition of the territories to which Article 5 applies was revised by Article 2 of the Protocol to the North Atlantic Treaty on the accession of Greece and Turkey signed on 22 October 1951.

Regarding Article 6:

 On 16 January 1963, the North Atlantic Council noted that insofar as the former Algerian Departments of France were concerned, the relevant clauses of this Treaty had become inapplicable as from 3 July 1962.

Regarding Article 11:

 The Treaty came into force on 24 August 1949, after the deposition of the ratifications of all signatory states.

See also
 NATO
 Warsaw Pact
 Treaty of Brussels
 Western Union
 2001 Sino-Russian Treaty of Friendship
 September 11 attacks
 Syrian Civil War
 Zaporizhzhia Nuclear Power Plant crisis
 Albania-Iran relations#Cyberattack and severed ties
 2021-2022 Belarus-European Union border crisis
 North Atlantic Council
 Enlargement of NATO#Article 10
 Withdrawal from NATO
 Aegean dispute
 Turbot War
 Turkish invasion of Cyprus
 Cod Wars
 2014 Wales summit
 2015 NATO emergency meeting
 2016 Warsaw summit
 2022 Brussels summit
 2022 missile explosion in Poland
 Operation Active Fence
 Operation Display Deterrence
 Operation Eagle Assist
 Operation Active Endeavor
 NATO Enhanced Forward Presence
 NATO Response Force

Explanatory notes

References

Further reading
 Watry, David M. (2014). Diplomacy at the Brink: Eisenhower, Churchill, and Eden in the Cold War. Baton Rouge: Louisiana State University Press.

External links

 Official text
 

1949 in military history
1949 in Washington, D.C.
April 1949 events in North America
April 1949 events in Europe
Cold War treaties
Political charters
Treaties concluded in 1949
Treaties entered into force in 1949
Treaties establishing intergovernmental organizations
Treaties of Albania
Treaties of Belgium
Treaties of Bulgaria
Treaties of Canada
Treaties of Croatia
Treaties of Denmark
Treaties of Estonia
Treaties of Hungary
Treaties of Iceland
Treaties of Italy
Treaties of Latvia
Treaties of Lithuania
Treaties of Luxembourg
Treaties of Montenegro
Treaties of North Macedonia
Treaties of Norway
Treaties of Poland
Treaties of Romania
Treaties of Slovakia
Treaties of Slovenia
Treaties of Spain
Treaties of the Czech Republic
Treaties of the Estado Novo (Portugal)
Treaties of the French Fourth Republic
Treaties of the Kingdom of Greece
Treaties of the Netherlands
Treaties of the United Kingdom
Treaties of the United States
Treaties of Turkey
Treaties of West Germany